Phosphate-regulating endopeptidase homolog X-linked also known as phosphate-regulating gene with homologies to endopeptidases on the X chromosome or metalloendopeptidase homolog PEX is an enzyme that in humans is encoded by the PHEX gene. This gene contains 18 exons and is located on the X chromosome.

Function 

The protein encoded by this gene is a transmembrane endopeptidase that belongs to the type II integral membrane zinc-dependent endopeptidase family. The protein is thought to be involved in bone and dentin mineralization and renal phosphate reabsorption.  The bone and dentin protein osteopontin (OPN) which inhibits mineralization in the skeleton and in teeth is a substrate for PHEX.   In the absence of functional PHEX in the mouse model (Hyp) of X-linked hypophosphatemia (XLH), and in human XLH where PHEX activity is decreased or absent, increased circulating FGF23 hormone results in low serum phosphate (caused by renal phosphate wasting) such that there is an insufficient level of this mineral ion in the blood in transit to mineralized tissues compared to the normal amount that is required for proper bone and tooth mineralization; this leads to soft bones and teeth. In addition to renal phosphate wasting, the mineralization-inhibiting phosphoprotein osteopontin and osteopontin fragments accumulate in the extracellular matrix of bones and teeth to contribute locally to the reduction in mineralization, which together with the systemic lower level of circulating serum phosphate, both lead to the decreased mineralization (hypomineralization) characteristic of the osteomalacia and odontomalacia typically seen in XLH/Hyp. XLH patients have soft and deformed skeletons, and soft teeth that easily become infected. Osteopontin (OPN) is a substrate protein for the enzyme PHEX whose enzymatic activity degrades/removes the mineralization-inhibiting function of OPN in normal mineralized tissue physiology, In disease, when the PHEX gene is mutated causing reduced or absent PHEX enzymatic activity, OPN that would normally be degraded and cleared remains behind in the extracellular matrix of bones and teeth, accumulating locally in the tissue to contribute to the osteomalacia and odontomalacia.  A relationship describing local, physiologic double-negative (inhibiting inhibitors) regulation of mineralization involving OPN has been termed the Stenciling Principle of mineralization, whereby enzyme-substrate pairs imprint mineralization patterns into the extracellular matrix (most notably for bone) by degrading mineralization inhibitors (e.g. TNAP/TNSALP/ALPL enzyme degrading the pyrophosphate inhibition, and PHEX enzyme degrading the osteopontin inhibition). The Stenciling Principle for mineralization is particularly relevant to the osteomalacia and odontomalacia observed in hypophosphatasia and X-linked hypophosphatemia.

Clinical significance 

Mutation of PHEX leads to X-linked hypophosphatemia.

References 

EC 3.4.24